GeorgiaSkies was an American commuter airline brand founded by Pacific Air Holdings to operate flights in Georgia after the airline was awarded an Essential Air Service contract to serve Athens and Macon, Georgia.  The airline started flights on September 29, 2008 and used the airline identifiers and call signs of its parent company Pacific Wings. The airline was headquartered in Dallas, Texas.

Cessation of service
GeorgiaSkies reportedly no longer flies between Macon and Atlanta, although GeorgiaSkies has a press release stating that "GeorgiaSkies has been ordered to continue serving the City until a replacement carrier can be found."

Former Destinations
GeorgiaSkies' system map showed the airline serving the Atlanta and Macon destinations. However, GeorgiaSkies has reportedly stopped flying between those two destinations. The airline ceased operating in late summer of 2012.

United States

Georgia
Athens (Athens Ben Epps Airport)
Atlanta (Hartsfield-Jackson Atlanta International Airport) Hub
Macon (Middle Georgia Regional Airport)

Fleet
GeorgiaSkies operated two 9-passenger Cessna 208B Grand Caravan aircraft.

See also 
 List of defunct airlines of the United States

References

External links
GeorgiaSkies

Defunct airlines of the United States
Airlines established in 2008
Airlines based in Texas